The Catholic Church in Argentina comprises fourteen ecclesiastical provinces each headed by a Metropolitan archbishop. The provinces are in turn subdivided into 48 dioceses and 14 archdioceses each headed by a bishop or an archbishop.

Latin/rite-mixed Provinces and (Arch)Dioceses

Latin Exempt Jurisdictions 
 Military Bishopric of Argentina

Ecclesiastical province of Bahía Blanca 
Metropolitan Archdiocese of Bahía Blanca
Diocese of Alto Valle del Río Negro
Diocese of Comodoro Rivadavia
Diocese of Río Gallegos
Diocese of San Carlos de Bariloche
Diocese of Santa Rosa
Diocese of Viedma
Territorial Prelature of Esquel

Ecclesiastical province of Buenos Aires 
Metropolitan Archdiocese of Buenos Aires
Diocese of Avellaneda-Lanús
Diocese of Gregorio de Laferrère
Diocese of Lomas de Zamora
Diocese of Morón
Diocese of Quilmes
Maronite Eparchy of San Charbel en Buenos Aires
Diocese of San Isidro
Diocese of San Justo
Diocese of San Martín
Diocese of San Miguel
Ukrainian Catholic Eparchy of Santa María del Patrocinio en Buenos Aires

Ecclesiastical province of Córdoba 
Metropolitan Archdiocese of Córdoba
Diocese of Cruz del Eje
Diocese of Villa de la Concepción del Río Cuarto
Diocese of San Francisco
Diocese of Villa María
Territorial Prelature of Deán Funes

Ecclesiastical province of Corrientes 
Metropolitan Archdiocese of Corrientes
Diocese of Goya
Diocese of Oberá
Diocese of Posadas
Diocese of Puerto Iguazú
Diocese of Santo Tomé

Ecclesiastical province of La Plata 
Metropolitan Archdiocese of La Plata
Diocese of Azul
Diocese of Chascomús
Diocese of Mar del Plata

Ecclesiastical province of Mercedes–Luján 
 Archdiocese of Mercedes–Luján
Diocese of Merlo-Moreno
Diocese of Nueve de Julio
Diocese of Zárate-Campana

Ecclesiastical province of Mendoza 
Metropolitan Archdiocese of Mendoza
Diocese of Neuquén
Diocese of San Rafael

Ecclesiastical province of Paraná 
Metropolitan Archdiocese of Paraná
Diocese of Concordia
Diocese of Gualeguaychú

Ecclesiastical province of Resistencia 
Metropolitan Archdiocese of Resistencia
Diocese of Formosa
Diocese of San Roque de Presidencia Roque Sáenz Peña

Ecclesiastical province of Rosario 
Metropolitan Archdiocese of Rosario
Diocese of San Nicolás de los Arroyos
Diocese of Venado Tuerto

Ecclesiastical province of Salta 
Metropolitan Archdiocese of Salta
Diocese of Catamarca
Diocese of Jujuy
Diocese of Orán
Territorial Prelature of Cafayate
Territorial Prelature of Humahuaca

Ecclesiastical province of San Juan de Cuyo 
Metropolitan Archdiocese of San Juan de Cuyo
Diocese of La Rioja
Diocese of San Luis

Ecclesiastical province of Santa Fe de la Vera Cruz 
Metropolitan Archdiocese of Santa Fe de la Vera Cruz
Diocese of Rafaela
Diocese of Reconquista

Ecclesiastical province of Tucumán 
Metropolitan Archdiocese of Tucumán
Diocese of Añatuya
Diocese of Concepción
Diocese of Santiago del Estero

Eastern Catholic Sui iuris Jurisdictions 
 Eparchy of San Gregorio de Narek en Buenos Aires
 Melkite Catholic Apostolic Exarchate of Argentina
 Ordinariate for Eastern Catholics in Argentina (other Eastern Catholic rites)

Gallery of Archdioceses

See also 
 Catholicism in Argentina.
 List of Catholic dioceses (structured view)
 List of Catholic dioceses (alphabetical)

References 
 Argentine Episcopal Conference 
 Catholic Hierarchy
 Argentine Catholic Informative Agency Dioceses and map.

External links 
 GCatholic.org.
 Catholic-Hierarchy

Argentina
Argentina religion-related lists